The Great Seal Act 1688 (1 Will & Mary c 21) is an Act of the Parliament of England.  section 1 of the Act is still in force in Great Britain.

The Act was passed because the office of Lord Chancellor had been put in commission (that is, divided between several officers at the same time, instead of being held by a single individual). Section 1 of the Act states that the commissioners are to be called Lords Commissioners of the Great Seal of England, and that each lord commissioner is to have the same powers as the Lord Chancellor has. Each lord commissioner is to rank in the order of precedence after the Speaker of the House of Commons. The office was last in commission in 1850.

 the Lord Chancellor is Brandon Lewis.

Repeals
The rest of the Act has been repealed. Sections 2 and 3 were repealed by section 8(2) of, and Part I of Schedule 5 to, the Justices of the Peace Act 1968. Sections 4 to 6 were repealed by Schedule 4 to the Local Government (Clerks) Act 1931. Sections 7 and 8 were repealed by Schedule 1 to the Statute Law Revision Act 1948. Section 9 was repealed by section 4 of the Lancaster County Clerk Act 1871.

References
Halsbury's Statutes,

External links
The Great Seal Act 1688, as amended from the National Archives.

Acts of the Parliament of England
1688 in law
1688 in England